Stanley is an American situation comedy starring Buddy Hackett, Carol Burnett, and the voice of Paul Lynde. It aired on NBC-TV from September 24, 1956 to March 11, 1957 during the 1956–1957 television season. It was produced by Max Liebman, who previously produced Sid Caesar's Your Show of Shows, co-sponsored by American Tobacco (Pall Mall cigarettes) and The Toni Company (Bobbi Home Permanent, Pamper Shampoo).

Plot summary
Stanley revolved around the adventures of the namesake character (Hackett) as the operator of a newsstand in a posh hotel in New York City, the Sussex-Fenton.  Burnett played his girlfriend Celia, and Lynde voiced the unseen hotel owner Mr. Fenton, who never appeared on camera but frequently could be heard giving orders to his staff.

In the show's introduction, the following line was recited: "You think you've got troubles. Stanley, he's got troubles!"

Broadcast history
As was the case with several such programs (but a declining number, even at this early stage of network television), Stanley was aired live. The complete run of the series, preserved on kinescope film, is known to exist and the show is available via streaming and has been released on DVD. The program aired on Monday nights at 8:30 pm EST opposite the popular Arthur Godfrey's Talent Scouts on CBS and the long-running The Voice of Firestone on ABC. After 19 weeks of low ratings, Stanley was canceled mid-season and replaced by Tales of Wells Fargo, a western which ran on NBC for the next five and a half years.

Episodes

Home media
In the early 2010s, the full 19 episode series was digitally re-mastered and released on a 3-disc DVD set by Stanley Productions, LLC. It is currently also available for download and streaming via Amazon.

Cast
Buddy Hackett as Stanley Peck
Carol Burnett as Celia
Paul Lynde as Horace Fenton (voice only)
Reedy Talton as Marvin
Frederic Tozere as Mr. Phillips
Jane Connell as Jane

On February 16, 1964, Hackett and Burnett were reunited on CBS-TV's What's My Line? A blind-folded Hackett recognized his former co-star's voice  who appeared as that evening's mystery guest. After briefly discussing their short-lived roles on Stanley, Buddy exclaimed  "That's the one the Nielsen guy threw off the air for us!" This was a reference to the show's first guest that evening who signed in as "Mr. X". He was actually A.C. Nielsen Jr. who headed Nielsen Media Research.

References

External links
 

1956 American television series debuts
1957 American television series endings
1950s American sitcoms
American live television series
Black-and-white American television shows
NBC original programming
Television series set in hotels
Television shows set in New York City